The Republikanischer Schutzbund was an Austrian paramilitary organization established in 1923 by the Social Democratic Workers' Party (SDAPÖ) to secure power in the face of rising political radicalization after World War I.

It had a Czech section associated with the Czechoslovak Social Democratic Workers Party in the Republic of Austria.

History

1918–1927

Precursor organisations 

As post-war Austria had suffered from not just political, but primarily administrative chaos, public safety was no longer able to be guaranteed by the state only. In order to defend in particular armaments and other larger factories, as well as the general population against potential marauders, improvised popular police forces were crafted by various political actors. The most relevant of these improvised police forces were instituted by the socialists, specifically in November 1918 to safeguard the founding of the first Austrian republic.

These workers’ militias (Arbeiterwehren) were kept organized after the reconstitution of basic public order, due to the large-scale creation of right-wing militias for similar purposes, and would form the organizational core of the later Schutzbund.

In 1920, the socialists would officially sanction the beginning of a merger and extension of the various workers’ militias into a single unified, but for now unarmed militia, due to the dangers posed by the attempted coups of Karl Habsburg in Hungary, as well as right-wing "gangs crossing the border from Bavaria." In the case of clashes with Hungarian militiamen over the status of Burgenland, the now-consolidated workers’ militia received arms from the Austrian state.

Development of the Schutzbund 

In 1921, Julius Deutsch – previously Austrian minister for the army – demanded the official development of this only fundamentally unified workers’ militia into a truly consolidated and properly organized party militia. After further intra-party talks, Deutsch finally called for the creation of a "Republikanischer Schutzbund" in 1922, which was officially registered as an association in 1923. 

In these four years of development of socialist militia activities, the questions of armament and degree of military organization were the most controversially discussed among the socialists. Most vehemently in favor of consistent armament of the Schutzbund were the communists. Despite its relative unpopularity, the Communist Party still enjoyed relevant influence in various workers’ organizations, among others those tasked with the development of the Schutzbund. Julius Deutsch likewise favored consistent armament, however attempting to delay such in 1923 due to potential complications with the occupying entente powers over re-armament questions.

Despite confiscations of weaponry by the entente powers and some arms sales for funds, the consolidated workers’ militia possessed in 1921 roughly 26,000 rifles, 225 machine guns, 2.5 million rounds of ammunition and several artillery pieces. 

The years from 1923 to 1927 saw various clashes between the main political actors of the time and their paramilitaries – socialists and their Schutzbund and Christian conservatives and their Heimwehren or other paramilitary organisations. Austrian national socialists also grew in relevance, clashing with both socialists and Christian conservatives.

The Schutzbund during the July Revolt of 1927

Immediate background 

The small town of Schattendorf in the recently annexed, previously Hungarian state of Burgenland had been site of several violent clashes between socialists and conservatives. Particularly after 1926, Hungarian irredentists and land-owning farmers, representing a relevant share of local conservatives, clashed on a daily basis with the majority of the population sympathizing with the socialists, consisting of factory workers and peasants.

In January 1927, Schutzbund members of Schattendorf confronted members of the right-wing and Homeguard-related Frontkämpfervereinigung, which led to a mild skirmish. After the skirmish had already died down and both parties were on their way out, members of the Frontkämpfervereinigung shot at the leaving Schutzbund members from ambush, injuring five and killing two – a six-year old boy and an adult war veteran.

The murders of Schattendorf, as they were known, led to protests in all of Austria, particularly in Vienna, where the protests climaxed in a brief strike.

The Revolt 

Three perpetrators were identified in Schattendorf, and charged with murder in a jury trial. The three perpetrators, locals of Schattendorf, considered their actions to be self-defence against alleged gunshots coming from the Schutzbund members. The jury eventually acquitted the three perpetrators on all counts.

The socialists had originally introduced and popularized the concept of jury trials as part of their political programme and considered it propagandistically unwise to organize a formal protest against the verdict. Thusly, while news of the acquittal led to immediate protests in the entirety of Vienna in the early hours of 15 July 1927, they were spontaneous and unplanned. These protests were later unwillingly directed by police riot control action to the Palace of Justice (Justizpalast), where the protests reached their height. Given the lacking interest in organizing a protest, party leadership had not activated the Schutzbund in advance either. It was eventually called to action, when it was clear that immense masses of workers plunged into the streets to take part in the protest and when even Viennese police were asking them for help. At this point, the majority of Schutzbund members received an order to mobilize, although not few Schutzbund members denied this order and remained part of the protesting masses. By 1 PM, roughly 2,400 Schutzbund men arrived at the scene, armed and in uniform – opposed to tens of thousands of protesters.

The Schutzbund, together with Karl Seitz and Theodor Körner, continuously attempted to pacify the masses in order to prevent further violent excesses. When the Palace of Justice had been set ablaze in the course of events, Schutzbund members successfully struggled to open a corridor amongst the protesters to make way for firefighters, as well as saved a few dozen guards from the flames.

Eventually, Viennese police chief Schober ordered to open fire on the protesters, killing 84 and injuring more than one thousand, including 11 killed and 34 injured Schutzbund members.

1927–1934 

Immediately following the July Revolt and further militarization of right-wing militias, socialist party leadership recognized the need for Schutzbund reforms, in order to guarantee its military capabilities. Socialist party leadership had instituted a reform committee – among its members being Julius Deutsch, Otto Bauer and Theodor Körner – to work out a concrete a reform programme. Lacking discipline among the Schutzbund men was lamented in particular, with Körner forcing strict military discipline for the post-reform Schutzbund. As Deutsch said, the Schutzbund was finally to become the "guard of the party and the trade unions." Körner from now on would start to open meetings of Schutzbund members not in a comradely way, but by ordering "Attention!"

New Schutzbund men would now have to sign a declaration of commitment and swear an oath, candidates would be screened more thoroughly, and they were required to have been members of the party for at least two years. “Technical” (military) and administrative organization were strictly divided, as was common in militaries. The Schutzbund also received a more stringent hierarchy consisting of groups, platoons, companies and battalions in ascending order by members. Körner was appointed one of the lead strategists of the Technical Committee, Rudolf Löw as his secretary. Alexander Eifler was appointed commander of all Schutzbund formations in Vienna.

In summary, the Schutzbund was turned into a strictly hierarchical, disciplined military organization.

Pfrimer putsch 

The years following the July Revolt would not experience any abatement of the constant edge of violence that Austrian politics have existed on since then. The Homeguards would experience a period of stagnation, even organizational degeneration. Despite their unity on some central reactionary ideals, the Homeguard movement had always been relatively heterogenous and riddled with strife. Following various unsuccessful attempts at furthering their influence on Austrian politics as well as the temporary resignation of long-time, more moderate Homeguard leader Ernst Rüdiger Starhemberg, Walter Pfrimer, a radical Tyrolean Homeguard leader, felt a coup akin to Mussolini’s March on Rome to be necessary to realize the political aims of the Homeguard, resulting in the so-called Pfrimer putsch in 1931.

The coup attempt started in the evening of 12 September 1931, which saw some 14,000 Homeguard men swarm out to most of Styria, arresting mayors and public officials. In order to replicate the March on Rome, Pfrimer and 600 more Homeguard men made their way to Amstetten, whereafter they would march to Vienna. However, they were easily stopped by Bundesheer forces in Amstetten and arrested.

Socialist party and Schutzbund leadership was informed of the coup attempt just shortly after the Bundesheer and police, which allowed the Schutzbund to mobilize its forces in Styria as quickly as possible. Party leadership, however, ordered the Schutzbund not to use force against the coupists, as they were already reported to be retreating.

The coup attempt was eventually easily repelled, most coupists were able to return to their homes and receive only the mildest punishments for their participation. Pfrimer temporarily fled Austria for a few months.

The Austrian Civil War of 1934

Background 

The absolute climax of the First Austrian Republic and likewise of the Schutzbund as a party paramilitary was the civil war that lasted from 12 to 16 February 1934. It was the prime situation that the Schutzbund was organized for in the first place.

The Austrian political situation intensified further in the two years preceding the civil war. The Pfrimer putsch proved socialist fears right that the Homeguard movement was not just theoretically willing to coup, but also practically. Likewise, the mild response by Bundesheer and police forces had shown clearly a lacking willingness from the conservative Austrian government to oppose such notions decisively. Emil Fey, radical Viennese Homeguard leader, would state in an interview in February 1932 that a new coup was in the works, this time originating from Vienna itself, and which would force the current government to accept their conditions for political change, otherwise forcing them to resign. Homeguard leaders were called into government by Chancellor Dollfuss in May 1932, where Emil Fey himself a few months later in early 1933 assumed the post of Minister for Public Security, thusly gaining control of the Austrian police and gendarmerie. At the same time, the Homeguard was declared an “assistant force” to the Austrian police and army.

This change of facts resulted in the need for a fundamental strategic reorientation in the Schutzbund, which had until now aimed to generally aid the Austrian police and army in case of a coup.

Starting in 1932, the government intensified its searches for weapons in known locales of the socialists with growing successes, thusly gradually decimating available weaponry of the Schutzbund. The weapons searches led to a propaganda campaign by the socialists intensely trying to recruit new Schutzbund members and gathering more weapons. Deutsch and Körner attempted to negotiate an omnilateral disarmament with the government, but to no avail. The Homeguard, as part of the government, was entirely unwilling to give up their weapons.

Following Chancellor Dollfuss’ "Self-elimination of the Austrian Parliament" in the course of the March Crisis of 1933 caused by the Railway workers’ strike, the Schutzbund was already on high alert. Parts of the Schutzbund, particularly the Upper Austrian division led by Richard Bernaschek headquartered in Linz, were pressing to finally decide on the use violence and warned of mutinies, but party leadership was still unwilling to give the order and instead continued to focus on negotiations, despite the physical and psychological readiness of the Schutzbund to enter combat.

This signaled to Fey as Minister of Public Security weakness of the socialists, which motivated him to push further the official dissolution of the Schutzbund. Decrees of dissolution for specific Schutzbund units were issued, some of which were met with little resistance and surprise, particularly those in Tyrol, Carinthia and Burgenland, some with immediate protests, particularly those in Vienna and Lower Austria. Weapons searches and confiscations went on as well.

Following the forced dissolution, the Schutzbund remained active in illegality; members met without uniform in different locations and usually only as small groups, rather than in large formations, and discussed further actions.

Most of the former Schutzbund membership was transformed into the so-called "Propaganda Division", former Schutzbund leadership being congruent with the new leadership of this "Propaganda Division". The signs of a coming fascist revolution marked the months before the civil war in early 1934, with Otto Bauer clearly demarcating by late 1933 the "four cases" in which the illegal Schutzbund would have to take up arms under all circumstances: Any infraction on the rights of the City of Vienna or the recalling of its mayor; forced dissolution of the trade unions; forced dissolution of the party; introduction of a fascist constitution or the abolition of free elections.

Following intra-party discussions on strategy, the reintroduction of military organization for the illegal Schutzbund was decided on by an "action committee" in Vienna, consisting of party leadership and others, among them Alexander Eifler. It drafted and decreed preliminary principles for clandestine military operations. A new resolution on tactics stated: "The party must intensify its struggle against the bourgeois dictatorship and use any potential for offensive action." The new clandestine military activities should happen to the public within the confines of the socialist sports association, the ASKÖ. Despite the stark losses in membership, the illegal Schutzbund had retained roughly 40,000 to 50,000 members at this point.

In January 1934, the socialists had again decided on trying to start negotiations; Deutsch had forwarded the corresponding letters to Dollfuss, who was thoroughly disinterested. Dollfuss considered the socialists to have become entirely irrelevant. Bauer concluded in early January already that "now, a resolution of this matter cannot be reached in any other way than a violent one."

Eifler tried to finish the final preparations for war of the Schutzbund, advising Schutzbund leaders to go into hiding, but stay in contact for orders. Nonetheless, most Schutzbund leaders ignored this advice and they were round up and arrested in the following weeks one by one, Eifler himself was arrested on 2 February.

Julius Deutsch was advised to flee the country to Czechoslovakia.

Many documents of Schutzbund strategy – among them Eifler's general strategy – were found by government forces. This allowed police and military to develop specific reaction plans.

The Civil War 

On 12 February 1934, police was ordered to search for weapons in the Hotel Schiff in Linz. This was the base of Bernascheks Schutzbund division. As Bernaschek as Schutzbund commander of this division declared multiple times that he had enough and that the next provocation by government forces would mean eventual defensive action by his troops, the weapons search triggered the Schutzbund troops in the Hotel Schiff to fight back. Likewise, orders of Bernaschek to other Schutzbund formations in Upper Austria triggered skirmishes. Once Schutzbund formations in the other Austrian states heard of Bernaschek and his men fighting back, many voluntarily decided to do the same and try to take over police stations in their respective areas. In Vienna, parts of party and the remaining Schutzbund leadership – Deutsch, Schorsch, Pollak, Körner, Helmer and some Schutzbund commanders – immediately met, where the majority decided to declare a general strike.

In the following hours, party leadership met to shape the orders to be given out to all Schutzbund formations, none of which were taken seriously at this point, as most Schutzbund formations, disappointed by the lack of input from Vienna, took matters into their own hands. Particularly those in Vienna, Lower Austria, Upper Austria and Styria took up arms on their own initiative, while the formations in the other states resigned themselves to waiting for more orders or were left leaderless.

Eventually, all Schutzbund formations were overpowered within the next four days, marking the end of the civil war.

That party leadership was unable to decide on issuing an order to fight quickly enough was later considered by Otto Bauer the "gravest of our mistakes."

Theory, Strategy and Organization

Principles 
The Schutzbund was formed ostensibly on behest of the SDAP's large left-wing faction, represented by members like Otto Bauer, Julius Deutsch, Max Adler and others. Unlike in Germany, the Austrian socialists had until 1934 largely kept their party united with the Communist Party never gaining any relevant traction as compared to the KPD or the USPD and much more resembling an ultra-left splinter group, which allowed the left-wing of the SDAP to utilize its much more extensive party resources and membership base, giving the Schutzbund a much more pronounced left-wing background, as opposed to its sister organization, the German Reichsbanner. Unlike the Reichsbanner, the Schutzbund also had a more tolerant relationship with communists in its own ranks, as well as with the Austrian Communist Party, particularly in the early 1920s and from 1930 onwards.

Its ultimate aim, regardless, remained the defense of parliamentary democracy and the Austrian republic against fascism, rather than the violent introduction of socialist policies or even an insurrectionary dictatorship of the proletariat modeled after Soviet Russia. Factions within the Schutzbund and its leadership however were open towards the possibility of utilizing violence to overcome a fascist coup not only after it had happened, but also when it would still be in the making, ultimately aiming to restore or safeguard parliamentary democracy in either case.

The Schutzbund was organized along military lines, particularly after 1927. Alexander Eifler, as the Schutzbund's chief of staff, favored a streamlined, classic military organization with a rigid rank structure and strict discipline. At its peak in 1925, it counted some 100,000 members and had access to a considerable amount of small arms and explosives as well as some artillery. By 1928, after its reorganization, it counted roughly 80,000 men, with more than 60,000 of them in Vienna, Lower Austria and Styria alone.

The "Technical Committee" 

The Schutzbund's "Technical Committee" (Technischer Ausschuss) was its military-strategic center. Its members devised the fundamental strategic structure of the Schutzbund and worked out all necessary orders for its subordinate formations, in essence representing its general staff. The Technical Committee was dominated by Alexander Eifler and Theodor Körner, both former Imperial Austrian officers, with diametral views on strategy. Where Eifler favored a streamlined, classic military organization, to fight in conventional battles, Körner considered the role of the Schutzbund to be one of a spearhead of a large workers' movement during a necessary general strike, utilizing guerilla rather than conventional combat tactics.

Uniforms and insignia 

Particularly in the beginning, the workers' militia and the later Schutzbund would not be able to organize proper uniforms, instead relying on red armbands. Later, these red armbands would display three arrows in a circle, the symbol of the SDAP after 1932. Afer 1927, the Schutzbund received more coherent uniforms, with most members wearing a brown-green high-collar jacket and dark pants, usually together with a Sam Browne belt. The aforementioned red armband was worn on the left upper arm. Some formations also wore patches that showed their organizational affiliation with roman numerals corresponding to their Schutzbund district in the upper half, together with the traditional socialist Bruderhände ("hands of brothers", a depiction of a handshake) in its lower half. Additionally, the best known uniform symbol of the Schutzbund would become its cap with Schutzbund and socialist party insignia.

The Schutzbund rank system referred to immediate positions of command, the commander of each formation holding a certain rank. As the Schutzbund was organized in groups, platoons, companies, battalions and sometimes regiments, Schutzbund members could hold up to five ranked positions. These positions of command were denoted by white stripes below or on the red armband or the Schutzbund patch, one for group leaders, two for platoon leaders, three for company leaders, four for battalion leaders. For district leaders, it depicted a "BL" for "district leaderhip" (Bezirksleitung). These ranks were naturally bound to a position of command and would be lost when leaving said position.

Top Schutzbund leaders, members of the central leadership (Zentralleitung) would wear armbands that bore the abbreviation of their organ: "ZL".

Organization 
The Schutzbund was an association formally independent of the SDAP, made up of various sections (formally independent component associations) delineated by districts. Its statutes were bound to agreement of the SDAP, as were decision to mobilize and the like. Two spheres of organization were recognized, the administrative and the "technical" (military). Administrative organization dealt with the acquirement of weaponry and other equipment, general finances and such, whereas the "technical" organization dealt with staff work, working out tactics and training men. The supreme organ was the "Federal Leadership" (Bundesleitung), consisting of the "Central Leadership" (Zentralleitung) (including the "Technical Commitee" (Technischer Ausschuss)), its auditing office and other organs of central organization. The Federal Leadership was elected on party conventions of the SDAP or appointed by SDAP leadership. General strategy was worked out in the Technical Commitee, with the Central Leadership acting as the Schutzbund's general staff. Militarily, the Schutzbund was subject to orders of the Central Leadership, which was responded to by a chain of command in descending order by the provincial and district leaders, then regimental or batallion, company, platoon and group leaders.

Until 1927, the Schutzbund was organized as follows:

See also

List of defunct paramilitary organizations
List of paramilitary organizations
Paramilitary
Reichsbanner Schwarz-Rot-Gold, paramilitary organization of the German SPD

Bibliography 

 McLoughlin, Finbarr. (1990). Der Republikanische Schutzbund und gewalttätige politische Auseinandersetzungen in Österreich 1923-1934. (Dissertation). Universität Wien.

References 

Military history of Austria
Paramilitary organisations based in Austria
Military wings of political parties
Social Democratic Party of Austria
Austrian Civil War